Cherry Street may refer to:

 Cherry Street (Toronto), Canada
 Cherry Street (Manhattan), New York, U.S.
 Cherry Street, Toledo, Ohio, U.S.
 Cherry Street (Philadelphia), U.S.
 Cherry Street (Macon), U.S., the location of The Telegraph
 Cherry Street, Hong Kong

See also
 Cherry Street Bridge (disambiguation)
 Cherry Street Historic District (disambiguation)
 Cherry Street Hotel, Toronto
 The Cherry Street Tavern, Philadelphia